Justice Satya Gopal Chattopadhyay (born 25 March 1963) was an Indian Judge at the High Court of Tripura from March 2020. He retired on 31st December 2022.

Career
Chattopadhyay obtained a law degree from the University College of Law, Calcutta in 1988 and enrolled with the Bar in the same year. He joined the Judicial Service of Tripura state as a Munsiff Magistrate in July 1991. Prior to his elevation to the High Court Bench, Chattopadhyay had also been the Member Secretary of Tripura State Legal Services Authority, Registrar (Vigilance) as well as the Registrar General of the Court. In February 2020, the Collegium of the Supreme Court of India recommended his name to the President of India for appointment as a Judge of the Tripura High Court. Chattopadhyay took his oath of office on 6 March 2020 which was administered to him by Chief Justice Akil Kureshi.

Notable judgements
 In March 2021, a division bench consisting of Justices Akil Kureshi and Chattopadhyay reminded the Tripura State police of their duty to notify the informants of action taken when their investigation in a case is complete.
 A single bench with Chattopadhyay on it ruled in January 2021 that a man cannot be absolved of his duty to provide for the maintenance of his ex-wife and children on the sole grounds of his financial inability to pay.

References

Living people
1961 births
20th-century Indian judges
20th-century Indian lawyers
21st-century Indian judges
Justices of the Tripura High Court
University of Calcutta alumni